

Directors of the 1950s-1975
Directors of the 1950-70s not only studied film abroad but brought back great imagery and creativity. As King Norodom Sihanouk was a fan of films himself since a child, he allowed the film industry to hold a huge part in Cambodian daily lives of the Sangkum Reast Niyum.
 Dy Saveth
 Hang Thun Hak
 Heng Tola
 Kong Som Eun
 King Norodom Sihanouk
 Sinn Sisamouth 
 Vichara Dany
 Vann Vannak
 Sovann Cheav

Directors of the 1980s-2010
Since the Khmer Rouge, it took years to recover from the downturn of the film industry. Contributors to this rising film industry included many female directors consisting of: Parn Puong Bopha, Mao Somnang, Pal Vanarirak, Channy Peakdei, and many others. Film directors such as King Norodom Sihanouk and Kong Bunchoeun continued with their career after the fall of the Khmer Rouge.
 Brendan Moriarty
 King Norodom Sihanouk
 Rithy Panh

Directors of 2010s-
 Huy Yaleng

See also
List of Cambodian films
List of Khmer film actors
List of Khmer songs

 
Khmer
Film directors